Graeme Garry Shinnie (born 4 August 1991) is a Scottish professional footballer who plays for Aberdeen, on loan from Wigan Athletic, as a left back or central midfielder. He has previously played for Inverness Caledonian Thistle, Forres Mechanics, Aberdeen and Derby County. Shinnie made his first full international appearance for Scotland in May 2018.

Career

Inverness Caledonian Thistle 
Shinnie started his career playing for Dyce Boys Club a boy's club in Aberdeen, alongside brother Andrew. He joined Inverness Caledonian Thistle in July 2009, at the age of 17. He made his senior debut for them in the Scottish League Cup on 1 August 2009, before making his League debut on 26 September 2009.

Shinnie went on loan to Forres Mechanics in the Scottish Highland Football League in February 2010. His loan spell was extended until the end of the season. Shinnie was offered a contract extension by Inverness on 30 November 2010, agreeing a 3-year deal on 13 December 2010. He suffered an intestinal problem that stopped him from playing between January and August 2011.

In the 2011–12 season, Graeme's brother Andrew joined Inverness on a free transfer from Rangers. Shinnie scored his first goal of his Inverness career on 27 August 2011 in a 2–1 win over Kilmarnock and after the match, manager Terry Butcher expressed delight for Shinnie on his first goal. Following a 3–1 loss against Dundee United on 17 September 2011, captain Richie Foran spoken out about Shinnie, stating he was worthy of pass marks. After two-months spell out for the side, Shinnie made his return in a 2–1 loss against Rangers on 17 December 2011. Despite the performance, Butcher praised the returning Shinnie and Lee Cox. In December 2012, Shinnie signed a new contract extension, keeping him until 2015, having vowed to remain at the club.

In the 2014 Scottish League Cup Final, Shinnie played throughout the match until it went to a penalty shoot-out, won by opponents Aberdeen. He was selected in the 2013–14 Premiership PFA Scotland Team of the Year. In April 2015, Shinnie helped Inverness to reach the Scottish Cup Final; Caley went on to win the trophy, beating Falkirk 2–1 on 30 May 2015, with Shinnie lifting the trophy as captain in his last game for the club.

Aberdeen 
In January 2015 it was announced that Shinnie had signed a three-year contract with Aberdeen, despite interest from Football League Championship clubs, and would join the club when the summer transfer window opened in June 2015. He made his competitive debut for Aberdeen on 2 July 2015, against FK Shkëndija in the first qualifying round of the Europa League. He scored his first goal for Aberdeen on 9 August 2015, in a 2–0 league win against Kilmarnock.

Shinnie signed a new contract with Aberdeen in January 2017, which ran until its expiry in summer 2019. In May 2017 he was made team captain, after it was announced that Ryan Jack had signed a pre-contract agreement with Rangers. During his four-year spell at Pittodrie, he took part in three finals (the 2016–17 and 2018–19 League Cup finals, and the 2017 Scottish Cup Final), losing to Celtic on each occasion. In the Premiership, Aberdeen finished runners-up to Celtic three times.

Derby County 
In May 2019 it was announced that Shinnie would join English club Derby County in July 2019 on a free transfer, signing a three-year contract. He scored his first goal for the club, an injury time winner, against Wigan Athletic on 23 October 2019.

Wigan Athletic
In January 2022 he signed for Wigan Athletic, for an undisclosed transfer fee, signing a two-and-a-half year contract. He returned to Aberdeen on loan in January 2023.

International career 
Shinnie made his debut for the Scotland national under-21 football team in April 2012. On 29 September 2015, he was called up to the senior squad for games against Poland and Gibraltar. He was called up again in October 2017, and in May 2018.

Shinnie made his full Scotland debut on 29 May 2018, in a 2–0 defeat to Peru. In March 2019 he was selected to play at left-back in a UEFA Euro 2020 qualifying match away to Kazakhstan, but was at fault for one of the goals as Scotland lost 3–0; in the aftermath, Shinnie acknowledged that he had performed poorly and would be unlikely to be selected again once Andy Robertson and Kieran Tierney were available.

Personal life 
Shinnie is the younger brother of fellow footballer Andrew Shinnie, who joined him at Inverness in 2011. The first time that the two brothers faced each other in a competitive game was in a 2016–17 Scottish Cup semi-final, between Andrew's Hibernian and Graeme's Aberdeen. The brothers grew up in Cove Bay and attended Kincorth Academy.

Playing style 
Originally a left back at Inverness, Shinnie played primarily as a central midfielder at Aberdeen.

Career statistics

Honours 
Forres Mechanics
Highland League Cup: 2009–10

Inverness Caledonian Thistle
Scottish Cup: 2014–15
North of Scotland Cup: 2009–10

Wigan Athletic
EFL League One: 2021–22

Individual
Derby County F.C. Player of the Year: 2020–21

PFA Scotland Team of the Year (Premiership): 2013–14, 2014–15, 2017–18, 2018–19

References 

1991 births
Living people
Association football fullbacks
Association football midfielders
Scottish footballers
Inverness Caledonian Thistle F.C. players
Forres Mechanics F.C. players
Aberdeen F.C. players
Derby County F.C. players
Wigan Athletic F.C. players
Scottish Football League players
Scottish Premier League players
Footballers from Aberdeen
Scotland under-21 international footballers
Scottish Professional Football League players
Scotland international footballers
Highland Football League players